Valeria is a Spanish comedy-drama streaming television series developed by María López Castaño for Netflix, based on the novel series En los zapatos de Valeria by Elísabet Benavent. It stars Diana Gómez, Silma López, Paula Malia, Teresa Riott, Maxi Iglesias and Ibrahim Al Shami. The first season premiered on 8 May 2020. On 12 June 2020, the series was renewed for a second season. The second season was released on 13 August 2021. In October 2021, Netflix reported that Valeria was renewed for a third and final season.

Premise 
Set in Madrid, the plot revolves around Valeria, a writer who feels that something is missing in her marriage and writing.

Cast and characters

Main
 Diana Gómez as Valeria
 Silma López as Lola
 Paula Malia as Carmen
 Teresa Riott as Nerea
 Maxi Iglesias as Víctor
 Ibrahim Al Shami as Adrián
 Juanlu González as Borja (season 2; recurring season 1)

Recurring
 Mero González as Zaida (season 1)
  as Cris (season 1)
 Aitor Luna as Sergio
 Melissa Fernández as Carmen's coworker (season 1)
 Esperanza Guardado as Lidia (season 1)
 Raquel Ventosa as Olga
 Cris Iglesias as Gloria

Guest
  as Carlos (season 2)

Episodes

Season 1 (2020)

Season 2 (2021)

Production and release
Benjamín Alfonso had been cast for the role of Víctor in pre-production but he was eventually replaced by Maxi Iglesias. Filming took place in 2019 primarily in Madrid. A film set in Fuenlabrada was used for indoor shooting locations, including Valeria's residence. It was released on Netflix on 8 May 2020.

On 12 June 2020, Netflix announced that the series was renewed for a second season, a report that was already leaked weeks before the show's release. Also produced by Plano a Plano, season 2 was written by Marina Pérez and Montaña Marchena and directed by Inma Torrente and Laura M. Campos. Netflix set its release date for 13 August 2021. In October 2021, Netflix reported that Valeria was renewed for a third and final season.

References

External links
 
 
 

2020 Spanish television series debuts
2020s comedy-drama television series
2020s LGBT-related comedy television series
2020s LGBT-related drama television series
2020s sex comedy television series
2020s Spanish comedy television series
2020s Spanish drama television series
Lesbian-related television shows
Spanish comedy-drama television series
Spanish-language Netflix original programming
Spanish LGBT-related television shows
Television series based on Spanish novels
Television shows about writers
Television shows filmed in Spain
Television shows set in Madrid
Television series by Plano a Plano